The 2009–10 Cincinnati Bearcats men's basketball team represented the University of Cincinnati during the 2009–10 NCAA Division I men's basketball season. The team played its home games in Cincinnati, Ohio at the Fifth Third Arena, which has a capacity of 13,176. They are members of the Big East Conference. The Bearcats finished the season 19–16, 7–11 in Big East play and advanced to the quarterfinals of the 2010 Big East men's basketball tournament before losing to eventual champion West Virginia. They were invited to the 2010 National Invitation Tournament where they advanced to the second round before falling to Dayton.

Offseason

Departing players

Incoming Transfers

Recruiting class of 2009

Recruiting class of 2010

Roster

Depth chart

Source

Schedule and results

|-
!colspan=12 style=|Exhibition

|-
!colspan=12 style=| Regular Season

|-
!colspan=12 style=|Big East tournament 

|-
!colspan=12 style=|National Invitation Tournament 

Source

Awards and milestones

Big East Conference honors

All-Big East Awards
Rookie of the Year: Lance Stephenson

All-Big East Rookie Team
Lance Stephenson

Rookie of the Week
Week 1: Lance Stephenson
Week 4: Lance Stephenson
Week 11: Cashmere Wright
Week 15: Lance Stephenson
Week 16: Lance Stephenson

Source

Rankings

1 - Note that rankings above 25 are not official rankings. They are representations of ranking based on the number of points received in the weekly poll.

References

Cincinnati
Cincinnati Bearcats men's basketball seasons
Cincinnati
Cincinnati Bearcats men's basketball
Cincinnati Bearcats men's basketball